Mission Beach may refer to:

Mission Beach, San Diego, California, United States
Mission Beach, Queensland, Australia